Chiu Siu Wai (born 16 February 1996) is a Hong Kong professional footballer who currently plays as a forward for Hong Kong Premier League club Tai Po.

Club career
On 2 October 2019, Chiu was loaned to Happy Valley.

Honours

Club
Tai Po
 Hong Kong Sapling Cup: 2016–17
 Hong Kong Premier League: 2018–19

References

External links

Chiu Siu Wai at HKFA

Living people
Association football forwards
1996 births
Hong Kong footballers
Tai Po FC players
Happy Valley AA players
Hong Kong First Division League players
Hong Kong Premier League players